Platovo is the name of several rural localities Russia:
Platovo, Sovetsky District, Altai Krai, a selo in Sovetsky District, Altai Krai
Platovo, Amur Oblast, a selo in Zavitinsky District, Amur Oblast